Methylobacillus is a genus of Gram-negative methylotrophic bacteria. The cells are rod-shaped.

References

External links
Genus Methylobacillus J.P. Euzéby: List of Prokaryotic names with Standing in Nomenclature

Methylophilaceae
Bacteria genera